The 2021 British GT Championship (known for sponsorship reasons as the 2021 Intelligent Money British GT Championship) was the 29th British GT Championship, a sports car championship promoted by the SRO Motorsports Group. The season begins on 22 May at Brands Hatch and ends on 17 October at Donington Park.

Calendar
The calendar was unveiled on 15 October 2020.
On 19 January 2021, a modified calendar was released.

Entry list

GT3

GT4

Race Results
Bold indicates overall winner for each car class (GT3 and GT4).

GT3

GT4

Championship Standings
Points were awarded as follows:

Drivers' Championships

Overall

Pro-Am Cup